Yuksom Breweries is a brewery based in Sikkim, India. The brewery sells three million cases of beer every year and is the third largest beer brand in India. The brewery is managed by famous Hindi film actor Danny Denzongpa and his family.

The company also owns a brewery in Odisha and the Rhino Brewery in Assam.

Beers 

The Yuksom Breweries produces the following brews:
 DANSBERG DIET (Premium Strong Beer)
 DENZONG 9000 (Strong Beer)
 JHOOM (Indian Premium Lager Beer)
 HIMALAYAN BLUE (Premium Lager Beer)
 INDIA SPECIAL (Premium Strong Beer)
 DANSBERG 16000 (Super Strong Beer)
 HEMAN 9000 (Ultra Super Strong Beer)
 YETI (Special Export Lager Beer)
 DANSBERG RED (Super Strong Beer)
 HIT (Super Strong Beer)
 INDIA SPECIAL (Quality Beer)

See also

 Beer in India

References 

Beer in India
Breweries
Companies based in Sikkim
Drink companies of India
1987 establishments in Sikkim
Indian companies established in 1987
Food and drink companies established in 1987